Jennifer Green is a dance music artist whose Mike Rizzo-produced single "How Can I Be Falling" was major hit on the Billboard Hot Dance Music/Club Play chart, going all the way to #1 in the April 2, 2005 issue.

See also
List of number-one dance hits (United States)
List of artists who reached number one on the US Dance chart

References

External links
   Jennifer Green's website

Living people
American dance musicians
American house musicians
21st-century American singers
21st-century American women singers
American women in electronic music
Year of birth missing (living people)